Jean Wilson was an Olympic Speed Skater.

She was born on July 19, 1910 in Glasgow but her family emigrated to Canada when she was a child.  She began to skate at the age of 15 and represented Canada at the 1932 Olympics where Women's speed skating was a demonstration event.  She won the 500 metre event, broke the Olympic record on two occasions on the way to claiming second place in the 1,500 metres and fell, while in the lead, just before the finish line in the 1,000 metres after Kit Klein from the United States.

She developed myasthenia gravis, an auto immune disease and died on September 3, 1933 at the age of 23.  In 1934 the Jean Wilson Trophy for indoor women's speed skating was created by the Toronto Telegram in her memory.

Notes

1910 births
1933 deaths
Olympic speed skaters of Canada
Sportspeople from Glasgow
British emigrants to Canada
Speed skaters at the 1932 Winter Olympics
Canadian female speed skaters